The Electoral district of Pastoral District of Murrumbidgee was an electorate of the New South Wales Legislative Council at a time when some of its members were elected and the balance were appointed by the Governor. It was a new electorate created in 1851 by the expansion of the Legislative Council to 54, 18 to be appointed and 36 elected. The district is located in the west of the state and was named after the Murrumbidgee River. Polling was to occur in the towns of Tumut, Gundagai, Albury, Wagga Wagga, Moulamein and Yass.

In 1856 the unicameral Legislative Council was abolished and replaced with an elected Legislative Assembly and an appointed Legislative Council. The district was represented by the Legislative Assembly electorate of Murrumbidgee.

Members

Election results

1851

References

Former electoral districts of New South Wales Legislative Council
1851 establishments in Australia
1856 disestablishments in Australia